Nicolò Albertini, O.P. (c. 1250 – 27 April 1321), was an Italian Dominican friar,  statesman, and cardinal.

Early life
Albertini was born about 1250 in the city of Prato, then in the County of Prato, part of the Holy Roman Empire, to parents who both belonged to illustrious families of Tuscany.

Albertini's early education was directed by his parents. At the age of sixteen (1266) he entered the novitiate of the Dominican Order at the Priory of Santa Maria Novella in Florence, and, upon his profession of religious vows the following year, was sent to the University of Paris to complete his studies.

Career
Albertini preached throughout Italy with success, and his theological lectures were especially well attended at Florence and at Rome. He served as lector (instructor) at the studium at Santa Maria sopra Minerva.  He was entrusted by his superiors with various important duties and governed several houses. He was made Procurator General of the whole Order of St. Dominic by Blessed Nicolo Bocassini, then Master General, and was afterwards elected Prior Provincial of the Roman Province. In 1299 Pope Boniface VIII appointed him Bishop of Spoleto and soon afterwards sent him as Papal Legate to the Kings of France and England, Philip IV and Edward I, with a view to reconciling them, a seemingly hopeless task. 

Albertini succeeded in his mission. The pope in full consistory thanked him, and made him Vicar of Rome. Pope Benedict XI was particularly attached to Albertini, with whom he had lived a long time in the same cloister. Shortly after his accession to the papacy (22 October 1303) he made Albertini the Bishop of Ostia, which office he held for almost 18 years. 

The civil wars that in the 13th and 14th centuries had devastated a great part of Italy, especially Tuscany, Romagna and the March of Treviso, caused the pope again to appoint the new cardinal Apostolic Legate, and to send him to restore peace in those disturbed provinces. 

Albertini's authority was also extended to the Dioceses of Aquila, Ravenna, Ferrara, and those in the territory of Venice. He was well received by the people of Florence, but after many futile efforts to effect a reconciliation between the Guelphs and the Ghibellines he left the city and placed it under interdict. 

On 26 October 1305 Pope Clement V (1305-1314) granted Cardinal Niccolò a canonry and prebendary in the Church of Tours, to be enjoyed in addition to his canonry and prebendary at Chartres.

On 29 June 1312, in the name of Pope Clement V, Albertini crowned Henry of Luxembourg as Holy Roman Emperor at Rome. He was later the leading judge in the trial that exonerated the Dominican friar, Bernardo da Montepulciano, from the charge of killing Henry by giving him a poisoned host at a Mass. He crowned Robert of Naples, son and successor of Charles II of Naples, as King of Sicily. 

As Cardinal Bishop of Ostia e Velletri and Dean of the Sacred College of Cardinals, Albertini served as an elector in the papal conclave from 1 May 1314 to 7 August 1316, the longest papal conclave in history, which elected Pope John XXII.

Albertini was Dean of the Sacred College of Cardinals from August 1312 until his death at Avignon. He was buried in the Dominican Church there.

The Cardinal of Ostia was known for his great love for the poor, especially for the poor of the City of Prato. He also gave generously to religious houses and towards the erection of churches. At Avignon he established a community of nuns similar to those founded by St. Dominic at the Church of San Sisto Vecchio in Rome. He obtained for his Order the office of Master of the Sacred Palace, that has always been held since then by a Dominican friar.

Works
Two small works are all that are known of Albertini's writings. One is a treatise on paradise, the other on the manner of holding assemblies of bishops.

Episcopal succession
{| role="presentation" class="wikitable mw-collapsible mw-collapsed"|
! style="background:#F5DEB3"|  Episcopal succession of Nicolò Albertini
|-
|
While bishop, he served as the principal consecrator of:

References 

1250s births
1321 deaths
People from Prato
Italian Dominicans
University of Paris alumni
Diplomats of the Holy See
Bishops of Spoleto
14th-century Italian Roman Catholic bishops
Dominican bishops
Deans of the College of Cardinals
14th-century Italian cardinals
Dominican cardinals
Cardinal-bishops of Ostia
Italian expatriates in France
Bishops appointed by Pope Boniface VIII